Məşədilər (also, Meshadilyar) is a village and municipality in the Tovuz Rayon of Azerbaijan.  The municipality consists of the villages of Məşədilər and Qozdərə.

References 

Populated places in Tovuz District